Jack Thompson (23 August 1927 – 7 December 1961) was an Australian rules footballer who played with Collingwood in the Victorian Football League (VFL).

He died after being shot by his de facto partner in December 1961.

Notes

External links 

1927 births
Australian rules footballers from Victoria (Australia)
Collingwood Football Club players
1961 deaths